Gnorimoschema septentrionella is a moth in the family Gelechiidae. It was described by Fyles in 1911. It is found in North America, where it has been recorded from Alberta, British Columbia, Maine, Michigan, Minnesota, Quebec and Saskatchewan.

The wingspan is about 20 mm. The forewings are brown, with the costal half of the wing a warmer hue than the inner half. The outward third of this costal part 
is striped with brown and rosy grey. The hindwings are dark grey.

The larvae feed on Aster junceus. They form a gall on their host plant.

References

Gnorimoschema
Moths described in 1911